is a role-playing video game developed by tri-Crescendo and published by Bandai Namco Games. The Xbox 360 version of the game was released on June 14, 2007 in Japan, September 17, 2007 in North America, and October 19, 2007 in Europe.

The game is centered on the Polish romantic pianist and composer Frédéric Chopin, who died of tuberculosis at the age of 39. The story envisions a fictional world dreamed by Chopin during his last hours that is influenced by Chopin's life and music, and in which he himself is a playable character, among others. The game's battle system centers on musical elements and character-unique special attacks. Light and darkness play a part in the appearance and abilities of enemies on the battlefield, as well as the types of magic that can be cast.

The game features a selection of Chopin's compositions played by pianist Stanislav Bunin, though the original compositions were composed and arranged by Motoi Sakuraba. It is notable for its use of classical piano pieces, educational cutscenes featuring real paintings and photographs (in contrast to the cel-shading graphics of the game) and lush landscape design.

Gameplay 
Eternal Sonata follows many general conventions in a typical role-playing video game; the player controls a party of up to twelve characters to explore the world, talking with its inhabitants, buying and selling equipment at shops, and encountering monsters while in the field. These encounters are visible, and the player can opt to avoid the encounter, if possible, as well as gaining an edge on the monsters by approaching them from behind.  Experience points are awarded to all members of the party, though at a reduced rate for those not involved in combat, and characters will improve in various statistics with each experience level as well as learning special combat skills.  Weapons, armor, and accessories can be used to improve these statistics, which can be purchased through money earned in combat, found in chests, or by selling both equipment and photographs which can be taken by the character Beat during battle.  The player may also find Score Pieces scattered about the world, which represent short musical phrases.  Various NPCs in the game will offer to perform with the party, requiring the player to match a Score Piece to the phrase offered by the NPC, with the resulting composition being ranked.  Discordant matches will result in no reward, but close or perfect matches will gain a bonus item from the NPC.

Combat 

While the main combat system is turn-based using only 3 characters within the party, it incorporates elements of an action game. Each character's turn is preceded by "Tactical Time", a period of time which the player can use to decide the course of action to take with that character.  Once the player initiates an action or "Tactical Time" expires (a function of the Party Class Level), the player then has a limited amount of time denoted by an Action Gauge to move the character, attack the enemy, and use recovery skills or items.  Regular attacks are made at melee or ranged distances depending on the weapon choice of the character, and add a small quantity of time back to the Action Gauge, and additionally add to the party's "Echoes" meter.  Special skills which can include both offensive attacks and recovery skills will consume whatever Echoes have been generated to that point, and will have a more powerful effect relative to that number.  When a character defends against an attack, there is a short period before the attack strikes where the player can press a button to block some of the damage for the attack, or to possibly even counterattack the blow and interrupt the monster's turn.  Recovery and other one-time-use items are kept in a common pouch with a limited capacity; the player must "set" items in the pouch so that they can be cycled through and triggered during battle.

Light and dark areas on the battle field generated by the time of day, environment, and shadows of the characters and monsters will affect combat.  Each party character has one or more special skills that are active in lit areas, and a similar number but with very different effects in a dark area.  Monsters themselves may have a dissimilar set of powers in the area of the battlefield they are in, while other monsters will actually change form when they move between lit and dark areas.  The player can manipulate the nature of areas using special items, but this can also be affected by the monsters themselves, or through dynamic changes on the battlefield such as the shadow of a cloud moving across the ground.

As the player progresses through the game, they will increase their Party Class Level.  Each improvement in level grants some bonuses while also imposing additional limits on combat.  For example, one Party Class improvement increases the number of slots for special skills for each character, but at the same time, cuts down the amount of Tactical Time and time available in the Action Gauge. This Level cannot be altered by the player in their first playthrough, but can be adjusted to the player's choice in Encore Mode.

Plot 
The game for the most part takes place within the dream world of Chopin, with brief segments in the real world, where Chopin is on his death bed. The story is divided into eight chapters, with each chapter being represented by one of Chopin's compositions, and being related to events within his historical life. The story begins with a small group of characters wishing to meet with Count Waltz of Forte regarding the mineral powder, but eventually evolves into a far-reaching tale, with political espionage and rebellion being a commonly explored theme. Escapism is also a large theme in the game, one dealt with explicitly in the ending.

It starts with Polka, a young girl that has magic, which means she is going to die soon. One day, after being rejected by the citizens of Ritardando, because average people think the magic disease is contagious, she decides that she wants to do something with her life before it ends. The initial party wants to find out why the mineral powder is so cheap compared to the floral powder and to stop the mining of Mt. Rock to acquire it because the mining damages Agogo Forest. As they progress, the party learns that the mineral powder has fatal side effects that would aid Forte's insurrection against its enemy, Baroque. Realising this, the party heads for Forte, but are stopped and taken into the Forte dungeon because Forte was alerted to the planned arrival of the rebellion group, Andantino. Shortly after escaping, the party unites with Andantino and are spotted by the same Forte personnel south of Fort Fermata (which is a short walk from Forte), and fall off a bridge into a river. Half of the party, along with Andantino, go through poisonous swamps to Andante, the hideout of Andantino. The other half of the party were saved by Prince Crescendo of Baroque, with his ship. They encounter pirates and defeat them shortly thereafter. After getting safely into Baroque, the party discuss the situation. Forte is threatening a war, but Baroque wants peace. Crescendo thinks of the plan to assassinate Count Waltz of Forte, but the plan is quickly discarded.

In the PlayStation 3 version, that half of the party, along with Prince Crescendo and Princess Serenade, are then warped into Lament Mirror. The party discovers the history of Baroque and Forte. They find out that they were also once at a similar situation of threat to an all-scale war.

That half of the party returns to Ritardando to reunite with the rest of the party. As they do, Allegretto leaves the reunion to retrieve Polka from her village. The full party then heads for Baroque and decide to explore Aria Temple, where they uncover a part of the mystery. When the party returns to Baroque, they find Crescendo and Serenade missing. It is discovered that they left for Forte to turn themselves in to prevent war. The party heads for Forte, and on the way (at Mt. Rock), they encounter Crescendo, Serenade and subsequently, Count Waltz. They battle, but Count Waltz completes a potion which turns his partner, Legato into a giant monster. Legato then rips a portal in the air and disappears with Waltz. Realizing that the entire world, not just Baroque is in danger, the party follows them to the city of the dead, Elegy Of The Moon, where souls lost to the mineral powder dwell. The party advances past Xylophone Tower and the Noise Dunes to Double Reed Tower, where Legato made another portal. There, the party defeats them and finally fight Chopin as the final antagonist, for him to complete his destiny. Realizing that it is the only way to save the world, Polka jumps off a cliff and is reborn younger, but then becomes older again and embraces Allegretto. Finally, back in the real world, Chopin's spirit rises out of his body and he plays his piano one last time, in a blooming sea of nocturnal flowers 'Heaven's Mirror', composing a song that was inspired by Polka.

Characters 
All of the characters in Eternal Sonata, with the exception of real-world people such as Chopin, are named after musical terms.

 : Main antihero, age 39. He is a renowned composer and pianist. In the world of his dreams he meets Polka, a young girl with an incurable illness, who is the same age his younger sister Emilia was when she died of tuberculosis. Chopin adventures with his companions in search of answers in a world which is slowly becoming his new reality. Voiced by: Mitsuaki Madono (Japanese); Patrick Seitz (English)
 : Age 14. She has powerful magic abilities, which means she is doomed to die. Faced with this sad fate, she nonetheless refuses to give up hope and uses her magic for the benefit of others. Although she is reviled and shunned because of her illness, she holds within her a burning desire to save the people she loves. Voiced by: Aya Hirano (Japanese); Erin Fitzgerald (English)
 : Age 16. A young man standing up to the contradictions of the world. Though Allegretto is poor, he has a good heart. He is a thief who steals bread in order to feed children who are not able to feed themselves. However, he knows that this is not a solution to the underlying problem. He has decided that he must do something in the hopes that someday no one will go hungry. Voiced by: Hiro Shimono (Japanese); Sam Riegel (English)
 : Age 8. Beat is a young boy who lives with Allegretto in the port city of Ritardando. His greatest treasure is a camera which was given to him by his father. He has a cheerful personality and can immediately get along with almost anyone he meets. Voiced by: Yumiko Kobayashi (Japanese); Mona Marshall (English)
 : A 26-year-old shepherd the party meets in the countryside. She's a tough talker and being slightly older than the others in the party, can handle herself. She has a pet named Arco, who tags along with the group. Voiced by: Hoko Kuwashima (Japanese); Megan Hollingshead (English)
 : An 8-year-old guardian of the Agogo Forest with her sister. The party meets her when they were imprisoned in the Forte Castle dungeons. Salsa thinks hats are the best treasure in the world. She is quite brash, outspoken, energetic and very competitive towards Beat.Voiced by: Mika Kanai (Japanese); Amy Gross (English)
 : The other guardian of the Agogo Forest; Salsa's twin sister. She tends to be the more reasonable one of the two, making her a sharp contrast to Salsa. March appears to be mature and gentle.Voiced by: Chiwa Saito (Japanese); Amy Gross (English)
 : Jazz is the 27 year old, leader of the revolutionary group Andantino. Quiet and serious, he worries about the damage Count Waltz might be doing to the people with the mineral powder and the processes needed to mine it.Voiced by: Joji Nakata (Japanese); D.C. Douglas (English)
 : Jazz's lieutenant in Andantino, she's perceptive and tough, and inwardly dislikes Claves. Falsetto is 22 years old and has known Jazz since childhood.Voiced by: Tomoe Hanba (Japanese); Julie Ann Taylor (English)
 : Jazz's 24-year-old girlfriend and another soldier of Andantino. A spy for Forte, but soon regrets it. Murdered by Forte's Rondo because of treason, but can be revived further into the game. Voiced by: Mie Sonozaki (Japanese); Tara Platt (English)
 : The young prince of Baroque. Crescendo replaces his father for leading Baroque into the future war between Forte due to a sickness his father is suffering on. He rescues Polka, Beat, Frederic, and Salsa after they fell into Adagio River. He is 29 years of age. Crescendo is only playable in the PlayStation 3 version.Voiced by: Katsuyuki Konishi (Japanese); Cam Clarke (English)
 : The fiancée of Prince Crescendo. She is 23 years of age. Spy for Forte—revealed by Claves—but leaves Forte to join Baroque. Serenade is only playable in the PlayStation 3 version.Voiced by: Fumiko Orikasa (Japanese); Stephanie Sheh (English)

Development 
Director Hiroya Hatsushiba stated:

For the localization, the game's text was proofread by the Frédéric Chopin Society in Warsaw. The localization team wanted to be as historically accurate as possible, without losing the original message of the script.

On April 23, 2007, the ESRB posted their rating for Eternal Sonata listing the game as being intended for release on Xbox 360 and PlayStation 3. However, when news of this quickly spread, the ESRB removed the listing entirely. On September 11, 2007, Bandai Namco's official site listed Eternal Sonata as coming soon to PlayStation 3, yet also listed the Xbox 360 version as being "available now". Again, as news quickly spread, the information was removed. The following day, scans from Famitsu were released, confirming the game as being released for the PlayStation 3.  On September 14, 2007 Bandai Namco officially announced Eternal Sonata was coming to the PlayStation 3, during Spring 2008 in Japan.

As Namco Bandai had stated, there are features exclusive for the PlayStation 3 version. This includes new playable characters, Crescendo and Serenade, who played a major role in the plot of the game, but were not playable in the Xbox 360 version. It will also include a new clothing system, in which the player can freely change a few characters' costumes, specifically those of Allegretto, Beat and Polka – the three characters that are controllable in the field at various points in the game. The other extras are the two dungeons, Lament Mirror and Church of EZI, the former of which is compulsory.

Eternal Sonata features a large soundtrack, mostly composed by Motoi Sakuraba, with seven of Chopin's compositions performed by Russian pianist Stanislav Bunin and presented in 5.1 surround sound. Featured music of Chopin's include Étude Op. 10, No. 12, Étude Op. 10, No. 3 and Polonaise Op. 53. A Japanese aria composed by Sakuraba titled  is also performed by Akiko Shinada for the soundtrack. The game's background music was released in Japan as the four-disc album  on July 25, 2007 under the King Records label.

Manga 
A manga adaptation of Eternal Sonata was drawn by Mimei Kuroi and published by ASCII Media Works under their Dengeki Comics comic imprint, and the chapters were collected into a single tankōbon on September 27, 2008. While it deviates from the game's story drastically, it does reach the same conclusion; in addition, Viola, Falsetto and Claves do not appear at any point in the manga due to the condensation of the altered story, and the roles of Salsa and March are greatly reduced, with the two appearing only briefly and not joining the party.

Reception 

Anticipation for the game seemed high prior to release, with the game having reached number four in Amazon Japan video game pre-orders not long after a demo was made available on the Japanese Marketplace, and even number one on Amazon Japan's video game charts not long before the game's release. Famitsu rated the game 9/9/9/8, for a total score of 35/40.
During its release week, the Xbox 360 version the game reached second place on the Japanese sales charts at 49,334 copies. The following week, it had dropped to 35th. The PlayStation 3 version debuted on Japanese sales charts at number four with around 34,000 copies sold. Famitsu reported that year-end Japanese sales of the game reached about 70,435 copies on the Xbox 360 in 2007 and 53,314 copies on the PlayStation 3 in 2008.

At E3 2007, it won GameTrailers award for Best Role-Playing Game and IGN award for Best Original Score on Xbox 360, and was a runner-up in Best RPG, Best Artistic Design on Xbox 360 and Best Use Of Sound on Xbox 360.

In 2007, Eternal Sonata was nominated for Spike Video Game Awards for Best RPG, but lost to Mass Effect.

The Academy of Interactive Arts & Sciences named Eternal Sonata as one of the nominees for 2007 "Roleplaying Game of the Year", but eventually lost to Mass Effect.

In Europe and the U.S., it received many high reviews. GameRankings gave the PlayStation 3 version an average aggregate score of 82% based on 28 reviews, and the Xbox 360 version 80% based on 59 reviews. Metacritic gave the PlayStation 3 version an average aggregate score of 80/100 based on 34 reviews, and the Xbox 360 version 79/100 based on 56 reviews. GameSpot gave it an 8.5 out of 10, praising its magnificent visual design, stunning musical score, inventive battle system and great cast; though it admitted that the story is completely linear. IGN gave the Xbox 360 version an 8.3 out of 10, claiming that it had some of the best visuals on the 360 and had great combat. They also stated that "the soundtrack is astounding" and claimed the story did a great job of educating the player about Frédéric Chopin. However, the game was criticized for its linearity and for the lack of exploration. IGN gave the PlayStation 3 version a higher 8.7 out of 10 and the Editor's Choice Award, with praise for its extension of the storyline, the inclusion of new playable characters, and the inclusion of other extras, such as new dungeons and customizable characters. X-Play gave the game a 3 out of 5 praising the combat, soundtrack and visuals but complained that there were too many mini games, a poor story and too many role-playing video game clichés. Johansen Quijano-Cruz of Eludamos: Journal for Computer Game Culture reviewed the game from an artistic and literary perspective, praising it as an excellent role-playing game, particularly for the social criticism conveyed by its storyline. He regards it as a primary example of a video game that "makes powerful statements about the society in which we live" and "incorporates, analyzes, interprets, and offers critical commentary of certain aspects of society".

References

External links 

 Sonata form
 Official Japanese website
 Official Japanese website for the PlayStation 3 version
 Official North American website

2007 video games
Cooperative video games
Dengeki Comics
Video games based on real people
Cultural depictions of Frédéric Chopin
Bandai Namco games
PlayStation 3 games
Fantasy video games
Role-playing video games
Shōnen manga
Tri-Crescendo games
Video games scored by Motoi Sakuraba
Video games developed in Japan
Video games featuring female protagonists
Video games with cel-shaded animation
Xbox 360 games
Works about pianos and pianists
Multiplayer and single-player video games